Articerodes is a genus of beetles belonging to the family Staphylinidae. Species of Articerodes have been found within the Palearctic, Oriental, and Afrotropical biogeographic realms. In the Oriental realm, four species were known, all from islands. The first examples found on the Asian mainland were discovered and described in 2008 by Dr. Shuhei Nomura, Dr. Watana Sakchoowong and Dr. Jariya Chanpaisaeng. 

They are placed within subtribe Clavigeriodina due to their occipital carina, elytral pubescence, and composite tergite. Members of Articerodes have three-segmented antennae.

Species 
Articerodes jariyae Nomura, Sakchoowong, and Chanpaisaeng, 2008
Articerodes kishimotoi Nomura, 2001
Articerodes kurosawai Nomura, 2001
Articerodes longiceps Nomura, Sakchoowong, and Chanpaisaeng, 2008
Articerodes ohmomoi Nomura, Sakchoowong, and Chanpaisaeng, 2008
Articerodes syriacus Sauley, 1865
Articerodes thailandicus Nomura, Sakchoowong, and Chanpaisaeng, 2008

References 

Clavigeritae
Pselaphinae genera
Insects of Southeast Asia